Josh Henderson (born 2 July 1997) is a Scotland 7s professional international rugby union player. He also plays for the San Diego Legion in Major League Rugby (MLR). His position is fly-half. 

He previously played for Glasgow Hawks, Glasgow Warriors and Stade Niçois.

Rugby Union career

Amateur career

Henderson played rugby for Strathallan School and Howe of Fife.

Henderson plays for Glasgow Hawks.

He was enrolled in the Scottish Rugby Academy in season 2015-16 in the Caledonia regional academy as a Stage 2 player.

The following season 2016-17 he remained a Stage 2 player but moved to the Glasgow regional academy.

On 25 July 2017 it was announced that Henderson would be loaned out to Stade Niçois, a Federale 2 club in France, outwith the French professional leagues.

Professional career

Henderson was playing for Glasgow Warriors under 16 side while still at Strathallan School.

On 30 August 2016 Henderson made his senior Glasgow Warriors debut against Canada 'A' at Bridgehaugh Park, Stirling, replacing Hagen Schulte in the middle of the second half.

He managed to score a try on his debut, with The Glasgow Herald noting that Henderson seemed hungry for success.

At Glasgow Warriors he is mentored by Finn Russell. Henderson said: "The main thing I took from my most recent chat with him is not just playing what is in front of me, but thinking a couple of phases ahead to give myself time on the ball and that has helped me a lot."

Henderson graduated to be a Stage 3 academy player for the 2017-18 season. Stage 3 players are assigned to a professional club and Henderson is assigned to Glasgow Warriors.

Henderson now plays for the Super 6 rugby union side Stirling County.

International career

Henderson has come through the age-grades with Scotland. While with Howe of Fife he represented Scotland U16s.

He has played for the Scotland U19s.

Henderson played with the Scotland U20s.

He has now signed a professional contract with the  Scotland 7s  side.

References

External links 

Youtube - Josh Henderson 2015-16 Highlights
Youtube - Josh Henderson Highlights
Scotland U20 player profile

1997 births
Living people
Glasgow Hawks players
Glasgow Warriors players
Howe of Fife RFC players
People educated at Strathallan School
Rugby union players from Kirkcaldy
Scotland international rugby sevens players
Scottish rugby union players
Stade Niçois players
Stirling County RFC players
San Diego Legion players